The name Rama Varma refers to a number of persons from many royal families of Kerala (southern India)

Members of the Chera Perumal/Kulasekhara dynasty

 Rama Varma (11th-12th century AD)

Members of the Cochin Royal Family:

 Rama Varma Sakthan Thampuran (1751–1805)
 Sir Sri Rama Varma a.k.a. Rajarshi and Abdicated Highness of Cochin (1852–1932)
 Rama Varma Parikshith Thampuran (died 1964)

Members of the Travancore Royal Family:
 Rama Varma of Venad (fl. 1724-1729)
 The musician Prince Rama Varma (Aswathi Thirunal Rama Varma) (born 1968)
 Moolam Thirunal Rama Varma (born 1949)
 Dharma Raja Rama Varma (1724–1798)
 Swathi Thirunal Rama Varma (1813–1846)

  Rama Varma Raja (1879-1970)